O. lutea may refer to:

 Odontadenia lutea, a flowering plant
 Odontites lutea, a dicotyledonous plant
 Odostomia lutea, a sea snail
 Oiketicoides lutea, a bagworm moth
 Oncis lutea, a sea slug
 Ophiocordyceps lutea, a parasitic fungus
 Ophrys lutea, an Old World orchid
 Orchis lutea, a herbaceous plant
 Orobanche lutea, a parasitic plant
 Oxystylis lutea, a plant native to the Mojave Desert